Real Salt Lake, often shortened to RSL, is an American professional soccer club based in the Salt Lake City metropolitan area. The club competes as a member club of Major League Soccer (MLS) in the Western Conference. RSL began play in 2005 as an expansion team of the league. The club was founded in 2004 when the club's first owner and founder was awarded an expansion berth in Major League Soccer.

The club plays its home games at America First Field (formerly known as Rio Tinto Stadium), a soccer-specific stadium located in the Salt Lake City suburb of Sandy, Utah, which they shared with their sister team, Utah Royals FC. Before moving to America First Field, RSL previously played home games at Rice-Eccles Stadium, located on the campus of the University of Utah, from 2005 to 2007. The team is currently led by head coach Pablo Mastroeni.

In domestic football, Real Salt Lake won the 2009 MLS Cup, and they finished as runners-up in the Supporters Shield in 2010, and the 2013 edition of the U.S. Open Cup. They were also runners-up in the 2013 MLS Cup. The franchise's greatest success to date was in the 2010–11 CONCACAF Champions League, where RSL finished runners-up in the tournament becoming the first American club, since the CONCACAF Champions League format was introduced in 2008, to advance to the final stage of the tournament. Their fully owned USL affiliate Real Monarchs won the USL Championship, the second division in American soccer, in 2019.

Name 
The Spanish title Real, meaning "royal" in English, has been used since the early 20th century by Spanish football clubs who have received royal patronage from a reigning monarch - most notably Madrid, Zaragoza, Betis and Sociedad. In choosing the name Real for the Salt Lake-based team, initial owner Dave Checketts intended to create a brand name that would become well known for its simplicity, followed the European-style naming conventions of the league, and would potentially foster a partnership with Real Madrid - admired both because of their successful football history and close association with basketball (similar to Checketts' own history with Utah's NBA team).

Local reaction to the new team's name was initially met with mixed feelings, with the name being accused of contrivance. Other suggested team names, such as "Highlanders", "Salt Lake SC", or "Union SLC", were initially preferred for the club by locals. However, by at least 2014, reaction to the name had drastically improved, with the team establishing an identity representative of the Salt Lake community.

History

Early years (2005–2006) 

Real Salt Lake became the twelfth MLS franchise when Major League Soccer awarded an expansion franchise on July 14, 2004, to SCP Worldwide, headed by Dave Checketts. Jason Kreis became the first player in RSL history, coming in a trade from the Dallas Burn. Other notable players who played in RSL's early years included veterans Clint Mathis, Eddie Pope and Jeff Cunningham.

RSL's first season was 2005 under head coach John Ellinger. RSL began play on April 2, 2005, against New York MetroStars at Giants Stadium, which ended in a scoreless tie. The following week, Jason Kreis scored the first goal in franchise history in a 3–1 loss to LA Galaxy at the Home Depot Center. RSL played its first-ever home match on April 16, 2005, before 25,287 fans at Rice-Eccles Stadium; Brian Dunseth scored a header in the 81st minute to deliver a 1–0 victory over the Colorado Rapids. The season was mostly a disappointment, however, with the team setting a league record by posting a 557-minute scoreless streak (later broken by Toronto FC). They were also on a 10-game losing streak before managing a 2–2 draw on the road against San Jose Earthquakes. The first season finished with a record of 5–22–5.

In 2006, Real Salt Lake's second season, the team recorded five losses and one tie in the first six matches of the season. RSL had gone 18 consecutive matches without a victory—the longest winless streak in MLS history. Jeff Cunningham, who came to Salt Lake from Colorado, provided most of Real's highlights during an otherwise poor 2006 season. The team failed to qualify for the playoffs, finishing with a 10–13–9 record.

Turnaround and new stadium (2007–2008) 
Real Salt Lake boasted a formidable attack with Cunningham and Kreis up front, joined by recently signed Panamanian international Luis Tejada. They were supported by veteran talent in the midfield and defense, such as Chris Klein, Carey Talley, and newly arrived goalkeeper Nick Rimando.
Their first game of the 2007 MLS season was a 2–2 draw for FC Dallas on Real's home turf. RSL were outscored 6–0 in their next three games. In a stunning move, Ellinger was fired and replaced by Kreis, who immediately retired as a player. Also, general manager Steve Pastorino resigned and was later replaced by Garth Lagerwey. The franchise launched a massive re-construction project that continued throughout the year. The team finished with a disappointing 6–15–9 record, missing the playoffs yet again.

In the 2008 MLS season, working with new general manager Garth Lagerwey, RSL added several key players including Kyle Beckerman, Robbie Findley, Javier Morales, Nat Borchers and Jamison Olave. As Real established chemistry together, they emerged as a force when playing at home. The team's home field advantage improved dramatically in with the opening in October 2008 of Rio Tinto Stadium (now known as America First Field), the new soccer-specific stadium in Sandy. Through the regular season, their home record ended at 8–1–6. Finishing 2008 with a 10–10–10 record, RSL advanced to the playoffs for the first time. RSL advanced past Chivas USA in the first round of the playoffs. The post-season ended, however, with a RSL loss to the Red Bulls in the Western Conference final.

MLS and CONCACAF success (2009–2012) 
In the 2009 MLS season, RSL proved nearly invincible at home, having a 9–1–5 record in Rio Tinto Stadium (America First Field), with a record-setting +23 goal differential. Real Salt Lake did not lose a league game at home since May 2009. However, the team struggled to maintain form during road games. In the final weeks of the regular season, RSL found itself in a battle for the final two spots in the MLS playoffs. However, thanks to a victory over Colorado in the final game of the regular season, RSL clinched a position in the 2009 MLS playoffs. Despite finishing with a losing record overall (11–12–7), the team was granted the last spot through a tie-breaker.
Real Salt Lake went on to win the 2009 MLS Cup by defeating the Los Angeles Galaxy in the November 22 final. RSL played the L.A. Galaxy to a 1–1 tie through overtime and won the MLS Cup (5–4 on penalties). Robbie Russell won the game on a penalty kick. Goalkeeper Nick Rimando was named Man of the Match. The victory in the 2009 MLS Cup qualified RSL for the 2010–11 CONCACAF Champions League.

The 2010 season saw RSL continue its home unbeaten streak. On October 16, 2010, Real Salt Lake improved their home unbeaten streak to 25 games after beating the FC Dallas. This win gave Real Salt Lake the most consecutive home games without a loss in MLS history. RSL tied San Jose Earthquakes 2005 record for a single-season home unbeaten streak with zero losses in the 2010 regular season. Real Salt Lake finished second in the race for the Supporters Shield with a (15–4–11) record. Goalkeeper Nick Rimando led the league with 14 shutouts, and Jámison Olave was named MLS Defender of the Year. In the MLS playoffs, however, RSL lost to FC Dallas in the first round.

For the 2010–11 CONCACAF Champions League, Real Salt Lake were placed in Group A with Cruz Azul of Mexico, Toronto FC of Canada and Arabe Unido of Panama. Real Salt Lake finished first in Group A, with a perfect 3–0 home record and a 1–1–1 away record.
RSL continued its run in the 2010–11 CONCACAF Champions League knockout rounds in spring 2011. In the quarterfinals, Real Salt Lake advanced by beating the Columbus Crew 4–1 over two games. In the semi-finals, Real Salt Lake beat Saprissa 2–0 in the home leg, before losing the away leg 1–2. The 3–2 aggregate was enough for Real to advance and become the first MLS team to reach the CONCACAF Champions League finals.
Real Salt Lake played the first leg of the finals at Mexican side Monterrey. RSL's Javier Morales scored in the 89th minute, ending the game in a 2–2 draw. The second leg of the final was held on April 27, 2011, at Rio Tinto Stadium (America First Field); Monterrey scored the only goal of the game, giving Monterrey a 3–2 aggregate victory.

In their 2011 MLS season, RSL's home unbeaten streak ended at 29 games on May 28, 2011, with their loss to the Seattle Sounders FC. Real finished the regular season with a 15–11–8 record and finished third in the western conference. In the MLS playoffs, RSL defeated Seattle Sounders 3–2 on aggregate. In the conference finals, RSL lost 3–1 to the LA Galaxy and were eliminated. RSL qualified for the 2012–13 CONCACAF Champions League, since LA had won both the 2011 MLS Cup and Supporters' Shield, and RSL had the next best record.

In 2012, Real finished second in the Western conference during the regular season. In the playoffs, RSL lost to Seattle in the conference semi-finals, and were eliminated from the playoffs. In the 2012–13 CONCACAF Champions League, RSL were placed in Group 2 with Herediano of Costa Rica and Tauro of Panama, but were eliminated at the group stage.

Hansen ownership and new academy (2013–2020) 
In 2013, Checketts sold his stake in Real Salt Lake to minority owner Dell Loy Hansen. Before the season, the club also traded key players Jámison Olave, Fabián Espíndola and Will Johnson. RSL finished the season in second place in the Western Conference with a 16–10–8 (W-L-T) record, and reached both the Open Cup and MLS Cup finals, losing both to D.C. United and Sporting Kansas City, respectively.

After the season, head coach Jason Kreis left Real Salt Lake to become the first head coach of expansion club New York City FC, with long-time assistant coach Jeff Cassar replacing him at the helm. Despite the departure, the club finished the 2014 season in third in the Western Conference, with a record of 15–8–11 totaling 56 points, and qualified for the 2015-16 CONCACAF Champions League. In the MLS Cup Playoffs, RSL was eliminated in the conference semi-finals by eventual champions LA Galaxy 5–0 on aggregate.

Despite a five-game unbeaten start to the 2015 season, the team eventually began to struggle in the standings, coupled with a loss to Sporting Kansas City in the semi-finals of the 2015 Open Cup. RSL also lost key player Nat Borchers, who they traded to the Portland Timbers before the season and all-time goalscorer Álvaro Saborío, traded away to D.C. United mid-season. Although late-season signings Luis Silva and Juan Manuel Martinez provided strong performances, the team did not qualify for the playoffs for the first time since 2007.

The 2016 season started with the Quarterfinals on the 2015–16 CONCACAF Champions League where they were eliminated by eventual runner up Tigres UANL of Liga MX by an aggregate score of 3–1. The 2016 season saw Real Salt Lake return to the playoffs but they were once again eliminated by the LA Galaxy, this time by a 3–1 score line on the road in the Western Conference play in game. In the off season, longtime legends Javier Morales and Jamison Olave did not have their options exercised by the club.

On March 20, 2017, the club announced that head coach Jeff Cassar had been dismissed from his duties only three games into the season. Daryl Shore was named interim head coach for the two games against the New York Red Bulls and Minnesota United. On March 29 it was announced that Mike Petke would take over the head coaching position following the game against Minnesota United on April 1. Despite a dazzling late season run, the team finished one point shy of making the playoffs.

The 2018 season was heralded with the opening of the new $78 million Training Center and Zion's Bank Real Academy in Herriman, Utah. The facility was praised for offering world-class training amenities year round for Real Salt Lake and the organization's other teams the NWSL's Utah Royals FC and the men's second division side Real Monarchs. It also houses the team's youth academy, which was moved from Casa Grande, Arizona, offering a single location and clear path for acquiring and developing young talent.

2019 saw the final seasons of both long-time goalkeeper Nick Rimando and defender Tony Beltran, both of whom retired following the end of the campaign. The club also saw the dismissal of head coach Mike Petke on August 11, following an incident between the coach and match officials during the 2019 Leagues Cup. Initially named interim manager for the remainder of the season, assistant coach Freddy Juarez was eventually named as head coach following the season.

The 2020 season, significantly shortened by the COVID-19 pandemic, nonetheless saw major change affect the club. On August 30, MLS announced that Hansen would sell his stakes in Real Salt Lake, Utah Royals FC, and Real Monarchs following controversy over his past use of racist language. Additionally, long-time club captain – and final remaining member of the 2009 MLS Cup winning side – Kyle Beckerman retired following the season's end, having played more regular season games than any outfield player in MLS history.

Change of ownership and a new era (2021–present) 
Unable to find a new owner, MLS took over the sales process on January 8, 2021, and RSL began the 2021 season with no defined ownership. Despite a relatively good start to the season, head coach Freddy Juarez unexpectedly left his role on August 27 to become an assistant coach with Seattle Sounders FC, leaving his own assistant coach Pablo Mastroeni to see out the season as interim. Under Mastroeni, the team made a late-season push to the playoffs, qualifying on the final day of the season through a stoppage-time goal by Damir Kreilach to give RSL a win over Sporting Kansas City. Despite barely making the playoffs, the team progressed to the conference finals for the first time since 2013, upsetting both Seattle and Kansas City (interestingly, through another stoppage-time goal) before being defeated by the Portland Timbers. This success led to Mastroeni being named permanent head coach following the season.

On January 5, 2022, Real Salt Lake was formally sold to a group led by David Blitzer, best known as a co-owner of the Philadelphia 76ers and Crystal Palace, and Utah Jazz owner Ryan Smith.

Colors and badge 
The team's official colors are claret red, cobalt blue, and real gold.

Uniform evolution 
Home, away, and third uniforms.

 Home

 Away

 Third/special

Stadium 

In 2005 a soccer-specific stadium was approved for Sandy, a suburb of Salt Lake City. However, a vote in 2006 struck down a funding proposal. Dave Checketts said that he would sell it if a proposal was not put forward. Parties from several cities, including Rochester, New York and St. Louis, Missouri, expressed interest in purchasing the franchise and moving it.

Finally, after months of discussions an agreement was put in place and Real Salt Lake announced that they would move forward with the construction of Real Salt Lake Stadium.
The Debt Review Committee of Salt Lake County, however, voted against the stadium. In response, Real Salt Lake's owner announced the team would be sold and likely move out of the Salt Lake area after the 2007 season. However, a new stadium proposal was passed by the State Senate. The Utah House approved House bill 1SHB38, approving $35 million towards the development of Real Salt Lake's new home. The governor signed the bill.

The $110 million stadium was built in Sandy, a suburb of Salt Lake City. The stadium was named after its sponsor, Rio Tinto Group. The stadium's opening date was set for October 9, 2008.

On September 10, 2022, Rio Tinto Stadium was renamed America First Field, with RSL and America First Credit Union announcing a naming rights deal.

Attendance by season 

NHG = No home game during playoffs

Longest home unbeaten streaks

 Only regular-season matches played with Real Salt Lake in Utah counted towards records.

Club culture

Rivalries 

The main rival of Real Salt Lake is considered to be the Colorado Rapids, with the two teams being the closest to each other geographically, and also competing for the annual Rocky Mountain Cup. Competition first began upon Salt Lake's entry into Major League Soccer in 2005, with the cup itself being awarded by a bi-partisan "Committee of 10", made up of fans from each respective club. Initially dominated by the Rapids, Salt Lake has since taken a 12–5 series lead over their rivals, and are the current holders of the cup, having won it during the 2021 season.

Although no annual trophy is involved, the club's more fierce rival has become Sporting Kansas City, initially born out of a 2011 preseason brawl and developed after the teams met in MLS Cup 2013.  Since that time, the teams have regularly competed in the Western Conference. Many of the matches, have been heated among longtime players who played from the two teams. Real Salt Lake has a record of 19 wins, 10 draws and 16 losses in all competitions against Sporting.

The team also maintains smaller, fan-driven rivalries with the LA Galaxy, Los Angeles FC, and Seattle Sounders FC. The latter derived from a meeting in the 2012 MLS Cup Playoffs, later expanding through further playoff meetings and the losses of general manager Garth Lagerway, head coach Freddy Juarez, and club captain Albert Rusnák to the club.

Supporters groups 

Real Salt Lake has five supporters groups—Salt City United, Rogue Cavaliers Brigade, Section 26, Riot Brigade and La Barra—which as of 2019 all exist under a larger unified umbrella group known as The Riot.

Leo the Lion is the official mascot of Real Salt Lake.

Club anthem 
In 2011, Branden Steineckert, drummer of punk band Rancid and a supporter of Real Salt Lake, composed the song "Believe" in honor of the club. Initially posted on YouTube, the song has since been adopted as the team's official anthem, being sung at the beginning of every home game, at the end of every home game if the result is a win, as well as after all goals scored by RSL. The song used prior to the anthem was the woohoo yeehoo lyrics from The Sweet Escape by Gwen Stefani.

Revenue and profitability 
As Real Salt Lake is a small-market team, one of the team's biggest challenges is bringing in enough revenue to remain competitive. Opening Rio Tinto Stadium in October 2008 provided a significant revenue boost to the team. Real Salt Lake went from 4,000 season-ticket holders before October 2008, to 8,750 in 2012, 10,000 in 2013, and 15,000+ in 2016.

Sponsors 

RSL has a multimillion-dollar sponsorship deal with LifeVantage. It previously had a multimillion-dollar deal with Xango a nutritional supplements company based in Utah, to carry the Xango logo on the front of RSL jerseys from the 2007 season until 2014. Additional sponsors include JetBlue Airways, Maverik, Inc., Ford, WCF Insurance, and Zion's Bank. Their corporate sponsors are America First Credit Union, Adidas, Atlas Disposal, City Creek Center, Coca-Cola, Collins Roofing Inc., Continental Tires, England Logistics, Utah Governor's Office of Economic Development, Great Clips, Key Bank, Les Olson Company, MarketStar (which is the jersey sponsor of Real Monarchs), Michelob ULTRA, Pikus Concrete, Planet Fitness, Presidio, RealMedia, Sew Sweet, Sherwin-Williams, Siegfried and Jensen, Summit Technology, Toro, Toyota, Utah Children's Dental Network, Utah: Life Elevated, WGU, YESCO, and Zagg brands. Their broadcasting sponsors include Broadway Network, ESPN, ESPN2, ESPN700, Fox Soccer, KMYU, KUTV, NBC Sports

Broadcasting 
Radio broadcasts air on KSL AM 1160, FM 102.7 (English) and KTUB AM 1600 (Spanish).

From 2023, every Real Salt Lake match is available via MLS Season Pass on the Apple TV app. Prior to the all-streaming deal, the club was aired across Utah on a number of television networks and stations.

Sinclair Broadcast Group held television rights to Real Salt Lake games that were not aired by Major League Soccer's national television partners. The telecasts (which, until its discontinuation, were originally presented by Sinclair's American Sports Network) featured pre- and post-game coverage. Sinclair's Utah station KMYU served as the team's flagship station, and telecasts were syndicated to other Sinclair-owned stations in the region, and non-Sinclair stations in Albuquerque, Phoenix and Tucson. In 2018, the team extended its television deal with Sinclair, and announced a streaming partnership with KSL-TV, under which it offered in-market streaming of RSL's regional broadcasts, as well as their former sister club Utah Royals FC (NWSL) and reserve club Real Monarchs (then in the USL), on digital platforms. In 2020, the team extended its television deal with Sinclair until 2022.

Players and staff 
 For details on former players, see All-time Real Salt Lake roster.

Roster

Out on loan

Technical and coaching staff
{| class="wikitable sortable"
|-
! style="background:#A32035; color:#FFF; border:2px solid #DAA900;" scope="col"|Title
! style="background:#A32035; color:#FFF; border:2px solid #DAA900;" scope="col"|Name
|-

Retired numbers

Jason Kreis's number 9 was not worn by RSL players after the time of its retirement in 2011. However, in 2019, when the club decided to retire Javier Morales's number 11, Kreis pleaded with the club to recirculate his number 9. As a result, both number 9 and number 11 are still circulated numbers for the club. Kreis and Morales's names and numbers are "retired" and displayed prominently above the player's tunnel on the west concourse of America First Field.

Team captains

General managers

Head coaches 
 Includes MLS regular Season, MLS Playoffs, CONCACAF Champions League, Lamar Hunt U.S. Open Cup, and Leagues Cup.

Honors 
 MLS Cup
 Champions (1): 2009

Team results

Year-by-year

This is a partial list of the last five seasons completed by RSL. For the full season-by-season history, see List of Real Salt Lake seasons.

1. Avg. attendance include statistics from league matches only.
2. Top goalscorer(s) includes all goals scored in League, MLS Cup Playoffs, U.S. Open Cup, MLS is Back Tournament, CONCACAF Champions League, FIFA Club World Cup, and other competitive continental matches.

CONCACAF Champions League 

 Did not qualify for Champions League tournament in years not listed

 Win %- Number of wins divided by number of games played (ties count as half a win)
 Games decided by a PK Shoot out counted as win or loss not Draw.

Leagues Cup

MLS records 
 Fewest goals allowed: 20 (previous record 23, Houston 2007)
 Overall goal difference: +25 (previous record +22, San Jose 2005 and D.C. United 2007)
 Home goal difference: +24 (previous record +23, Real Salt Lake 2009)
 Total home points (30-game season): 37 (previous record 35, Columbus 2009)
 Fewest home losses: 0 (equals previous record set by San Jose in 2005)
 Fewest home goals allowed: 7 (previous record 8, Colorado 2004)

Associated teams 

The reserve team of Real Salt Lake, named Real Monarchs SLC, was created on September 10, 2014, as a bridge between the club's academy program and the first level team. The team began play in the Western Conference of the United Soccer League during the 2015 season, playing their home games at Rio Tinto Stadium along with their parent team. Starting in 2018, the Monarchs will move to Zions Bank Stadium, a 5,000-seat facility located at RSL's new training center in Herriman.

A women's soccer team, called Real Salt Lake Women, was founded in 2008. The team is currently a member of the Western Division of United Women's Soccer, the second tier of women's soccer in the United States and Canada, and plays its home games at Ute Field, on the campus of the University of Utah in Salt Lake City.

Real Salt Lake added a second women's team, this one in the top-level National Women's Soccer League, in November 2017. This team effectively replaced FC Kansas City in the NWSL, as FC Kansas City soon folded and all of its player contracts were assigned to the new RSL franchise. Shortly thereafter, the new team, which will share Rio Tinto Stadium, was unveiled as Utah Royals FC.

Player records

Career
 Players in Bold are still active
 Only regular season matches played with Real Salt Lake counted towards all-time records. Stats from MLS play-offs, U.S. Open Cup, Super Liga and CONCACAF Champions league are not included.

Single season 
 Only regular season matches played with Real Salt Lake counted towards records.
 Players in bold currently play for Real Salt Lake.

Hat tricks

Player honors

League honors

MLS All-Star appearances

Players in bold currently play for Real Salt Lake.

Player awards
The following awards were given to Real Salt Lake players by Major League Soccer in the season indicated:

Team honors 
 The annual season-ending award winners are decided based on voting by RSL players.

Team MVP

Golden boot

Defensive Player of the Year

References

External links 

 

 
2004 establishments in Utah
Association football clubs established in 2004
Major League Soccer teams
Private equity portfolio companies
Professional sports teams in Utah
Soccer clubs in Salt Lake City
2022 mergers and acquisitions